The 2nd Guards Brigade was an infantry brigade of the British Army, formed in the First World War. It was formed in France in August 1915 with two Guards battalions already on the Continent and another two from England. It served with the Guards Division on the Western Front for the rest of the war.

History

Formation
The 2nd Guards Brigade was formed at Lumbres, near St Omer, France between 19 and 25 August 1915.  The 3rd Battalion, Grenadier Guards and 2nd Battalion, Irish Guards joined on 19 August from England and the 1st Battalion, Coldstream Guards and 1st Battalion, Scots Guards joined on 25 August from 1st (Guards) Brigade, 1st Division.  The latter two battalions had been amongst the first British units to be sent overseas as part of the British Expeditionary Force, crossing to France between 11 and 15 August 1914.  They served on the Western Front in 1914 and 1915 taking part in the Battle of Mons (23 and 24 August 1914), the First Battle of the Marne (69 September), the First Battle of the Aisne (1326 September), the First Battle of Ypres (19 October15 November), and the Battle of Aubers Ridge (9 May 1915).

War service
In 1915, the brigade took part in the Battle of Loos (26 September8 October) and Hohenzollern Redoubt (1819 October).  In 1916, it fought in the later stages of the Battle of the Somme, in particular the Battle of Flers–Courcelette (1516 and 2022 September), the Battle of Morval (2528 September), and the Capture of Lesboeufs (25 September).  In 1917, it saw action in the Third Battle of Ypres including the Battle of Pilckem Ridge (31 August2 July), the Battle of Poelcappelle (9 October), and the First Battle of Passchendaele (12 October).  It then took part in the Battle of Cambrai (24 November3 December).

In February 1918, British divisions on the Western Front were reduced from a 12-battalion to a 9-battalion basis (brigades from four to three battalions).  As a result, the 4th Guards Brigade was formed on 8 February 1918 by taking a battalion from each of the brigades of the Guards Division and the 2nd Guards Brigade lost the 2nd Battalion, Irish Guards.

1918 saw the return of the war of movement.  It had to withstand the German spring offensive in the 
First Battles of the Somme (125 March) then switched over to counter-attack in the Second Battles of the Somme (2123 August), the Second Battle of Arras (26 August3 September), the Battles of the Hindenburg Line (12 September12 October), and in the Final Advance in Picardy including the battles of the Selle and of the Sambre.  Its final action was the Capture of Maubeuge on 9 November.

Post-war
At the Armistice, the brigade was near Maubeuge, and on 17 November it regained 2nd Battalion, Irish Guards from the disbanding 4th Guards Brigade.  The next day it began the march on Germany and crossed the frontier on 11 December.  By 19 December it had reached the Cologne area.  Battalions started returning to England on 20 February 1919 and the last units had completed the move by 29 April.

Order of battle
The following units served in the brigade:
 3rd Battalion, Grenadier Guards
 1st Battalion, Coldstream Guards
 1st Battalion, Scots Guards
 2nd Battalion, Irish Guards (joined the 4th Guards Brigade on 8 February 1918, returned on 17 November 1918)
 2nd Guards Brigade Machine Gun Company (formed 1–19 September 1915; joined the 4th Battalion, Machine Gun Guards on 1 March 1918)
 2nd Guards Trench Mortar Battery (formed April 1916)

Commanders
The brigade had the following commanders:

See also

Notes

References

Bibliography

External links
 

Infantry brigades of the British Army in World War I
Guards Division (United Kingdom)
Military units and formations established in 1915
Military units and formations disestablished in 1918